Hull City Ladies F.C. is an English women's football club. They are not affiliated with Hull City A.F.C. and are based in Hull. Hull City Ladies home ground for the 2022–23 season is Easy Buy Stadium, Barton-upon-Humber, DN18 5RL.

History 
The Club was formed in 2001 and played in the Yorkshire & Humberside league before being promoted to North East Women's Premier League 2005–06. Just two years later they were champions of that league and were promoted to Northern Combination, but only stayed for two seasons and was back playing in the NEWPL. In 2011–12 the club merged with Beverley Town Ladies and in four years have gained promotion to the Women's Premier League Northern Division One after finishing champions of the 2014–15 season. The club has grown significantly over the last year, hence the need for the creation of a reserve team, who will play in the Women's Premier League Reserves Division.

Players

First Team Squad

Former players

Sponsors 
Wolds Engineering Services

FA Cup 
The club always enter into the prestigious FA Cup to test themselves against teams in higher divisions and other counties. In the 2018–19 season, the club reached the third round for the first time, before being beaten 3–0 at home by AFC Wimbledon Ladies

References

External links

Women's football clubs in England
Women
Sport in Kingston upon Hull
Football clubs in the East Riding of Yorkshire
FA Women's National League teams